Stuart Minifie is a former New Zealand Paralympic athlete. In the 1988 Summer Paralympics he won a silver medal in the men's 200 metres.

References

External links 
 
 

Athletes (track and field) at the 1988 Summer Paralympics
Paralympic silver medalists for New Zealand
Living people
Year of birth missing (living people)
Medalists at the 1988 Summer Paralympics
Paralympic medalists in athletics (track and field)
Paralympic athletes of New Zealand
New Zealand wheelchair racers